Andrew Silow-Carroll is an American journalist. In 2019, he resigned as editor of the Jewish Telegraphic Agency (JTA) to become editor of The Jewish Week.

Biography 
Silow-Carroll was born and reared in North Bellmore, New York.

He has served as managing editor of The Forward, editor of the Washington Jewish Week and senior editor of Moment. He was a reporter for JTA from 1987 to 1990. He was CEO and editor in chief of the New Jersey Jewish News for 13 years. At the New York Jewish Week, Silow-Carroll replaces Gary Rosenblatt, who is retiring.

Silow-Carroll lives in Teaneck, New Jersey, with his wife, Sharon. The couple have three grown children.

References 

20th-century American journalists
American male journalists
21st-century American journalists
American newspaper editors
Living people
Year of birth missing (living people)